Hrsta (stylized as HṚṢṬA) ("thrilling with rapture," "rejoiced") is a Montreal post-rock band currently signed to Constellation Records. The band's leader, Mike Moya (guitar and vocals), was one of the founding members of Godspeed You! Black Emperor. Hrsta's sound has been compared to that of Godspeed You! Black Emperor, Thee Silver Mt. Zion Memorial Orchestra and Set Fire to Flames, owing to Mike Moya's contributions to each. Hrsta, however, differs from these previous projects in that it features Moya as a vocalist.

The other members of the band are Brooke Crouser, Harris Newman, and Eric Craven. Lisa Gamble joined in 2007 and Nick Kuepfer in 2009.

Their latest album, Ghosts Will Come and Kiss Our Eyes, was released in the fall of 2007.

Discography
 L'éclat du ciel était insoutenable (Album, 2001)
 Stem Stem in Electro (Album, 2005)
 Ghosts Will Come and Kiss Our Eyes (Album, 2007)

Participation in other projects
 Molasses - Mike Moya and Lisa Gamble
 Elizabeth Anka Vajagic's live band - Mike Moya
 Lonesome Hanks - Mike Moya
 Set Fire to Flames - Mike Moya and Brooke Crouser
 Harris Newman - Harris Newman, solo project
 Sackville - Harris Newman, Eric Craven and Geneviève Heistek
 Hangedup - Eric Craven and Geneviève Heistek
 Shortwave - Eric Craven
 Jackie-O Motherfucker - Brooke Crouser
 Swords Project - Brooke Crouser
 Gambletron - Lisa Gamble
 Evangelista - Lisa Gamble
 Clues - Lisa Gamble

References

External links
 Hrsta homepage
 Constellation Records
 Alien8 Recordings

Canadian post-rock groups
Constellation Records (Canada) artists
Alien8 Recordings artists
Musical groups from Montreal